The Women's 50m freestyle event at the 2010 South American Games was held on March 29, with the heats at 10:00 and the Final at 18:00.

Medalists

Records

Results

Heats

Final

References
Heats
Final

Freestyle 50m W